Lezuza is a municipality in the province of Albacete, Castile-La Mancha, Spain. , it has a population of 1,358. The municipality contains the town of Lezuza, as well as the villages Tiriez, La Yunquera, Vandelaras de Arriba, and Vandelaras de Abajo.

Municipalities of the Province of Albacete